Nilt is a town in Gilgit District, Gilgit–Baltistan, Pakistan. It is located at 36°15'0N 74°25'0E with an elevation of 2260 metres (7417 feet). This area was conquered by the British in 1891 as part of the Hunza-Nagar Campaign.

References

Populated places in Gilgit District